Alexander Kermode (15 May 1876 – 17 July 1934) was an Australian cricketer active from 1901 to 1908 who played for New South Wales, London County and Lancashire. 

Kermode was born and died in Sydney. He appeared in 80 first-class matches as a right-arm fast-medium bowler and right-handed tail-end batsman. He took 340 wickets with a best analysis of seven for 44, and scored 681 runs with a highest score of 64* and held 33 catches.

Kermode died at his home in Balmain in 1934 after a long illness. He left a widow and a married daughter.

References

1876 births
1934 deaths
Australian cricketers
Lancashire cricketers
New South Wales cricketers
London County cricketers